Connie Young (born 1974) is an American actress. She is known for playing Peggy Barlett in Read It and Weep and Cammie Giles in The Singles Ward. She reprised the role of Cammie in The Singles 2nd Ward. She also appeared in Sons of Provo. Cult film fans know her as Holly Waits in Troll 2. Young is a member of The Church of Jesus Christ of Latter-day Saints.

References

External links

American film actresses
1974 births
Living people
American Latter Day Saints
Place of birth missing (living people)
21st-century American women